SPEA is an Italian company that designs and manufactures Automatic Test Equipment (ATE) for testing MEMS, Sensors, microchips and Printed circuit board.

The Company, founded in 1976 by Luciano Bonaria, today employs about 800 people, distributed among the Italian headquarters in Volpiano (Turin) and the subsidiaries located in USA, Mexico, Germany, China, Korea and Singapore.

The main application fields for SPEA's equipment are the following:
 Automotive
 Aerospace & Defence
 Consumer
 Energy, Solar & Power Electronics
 EMS
 Lighting
 Medical 
 MEMS & Sensors
 Mobile & Communication
 Touch Display

In all these fields, SPEA's equipment is used to perform electrical and functional production tests on the electronic devices before they are shipped to the customer, so to ensure the products are defect-free and will work correctly through time.

ATE for Electronics Industry 

Testers for electronic boards are divided into:
 "Bed of nails" testers are used for testing PCBAs in mass production, where the low cost of test and the near-zero field return rate are the key industry needs. This type of tester can execute several test techniques - such as In-circuit test, Boundary Scan, AOI, Functional Test, LED light test, built-in self-test so to provide a complete test of the PCBAs before the end-of-line test.
 Flying probe testers are often used for testing Low to Mid volume production, NPI, prototypes and boards that present accessibility problems  (so, components cannot be contacted by using a bed-of-nails test system). Linear motors and linear optical encoders on each moving axis make them suitable to probe points on PLCCs, SOICs, PGAs, SSOPs, QFPs, and others, without fixturing or complex programming required. The high speed of the latest flying probe models makes them suitable also for high volume production.

ATE and Automation for Semiconductor Industry
The range of SPEA semiconductor equipment includes:

 Integrated test cells for MEMS and sensors, combining pick&place handling, DUT contacting and complete final test capabilities, including electrical test, physical stimulus for functional test and calibration, and tri-temp thermal conditioning
 Mixed Signal semiconductor tester platform
 Power semiconductor testers and automatic power module test cells 
 Smart card module test cells
 Smart card modules, UHF &RFID tester
 Reel to Reel device handlers
 Pick and Place test handlers

Milestones
1976: Luciano Bonaria, researcher and designer of electronic testing equipment at General Electric, decides to go on his own and founded SPEA, systems for electronics and automation. The headquarters is in Volpiano (TO), and the first system put on the market with the SPEA brand is called INCIT.

1977: the first multi-function tester for electronic boards was produced.

1982: Several important products are produced: Digitest, the first Digital ICT Automatic Board Tester, and Unitest 500, the first model with multi-function architecture, which laid the groundwork for all future production.

1988: designed for the emerging semiconductor technology of the Soviet Union, the first equipment for testing microchips is made. It is named Comptest MX 500, and it is water cooled.

1992: new offices opened in France, Israel and UK. In the same year, the inauguration of Asia Operation.

1995: SPEA enters in the microchip testing market. One of the first applications in this field was testing microchips used in Swatch watches. These are microprocessors of a cutting-edge technology. Their energy consumption and cost are very low and SPEA conceives the machines capable of testing them. During the same year SPEA developed its first system for testing Mixed Signal devices, the C300MX (128 channels, 20 MHz).

1996: SPEA becomes the fourth company in the world in the board tester field. 4040 was the first system for testing high-density electronic boards with flying probe technology.

1998: C340MX, a new version of tester for mixed signal devices (128ch, 40 MHz).

2002: H1000 is the first handler for testing components mounted on reels.

2003: the first Pick & Place Handler for testing microchips on tray, was made. SPEA becomes the No. 1 company in Europe in the field of equipment for testing electronic boards.

2005: SPEA introduces a new series of bed-of-nails testers: 3030.  During the same year, SAP Test & Automation was inaugurated in Singapore.

2006: SPEA presents the C430MX, a compact tester for multi-site Mixed Signal and Power Devices.

2007: The first MEMS Test Cell was put on the market. It is the first integrated equipment for the handling and testing of inertial MEMS micro-sensors in the world. An innovation which leads to the large-scale penetration of MEMS technologies in consumer applications. Other two products are launched: the 4040 Multimode flying probe tester, and the 3030 Twin high-productivity in-circuit test cell.

2008: SPEA manufactured the H3560 pick & place test handler. During the same year, the C600MX (high pin count mixed signal tester), and the STC Series (smart card module test cells) are presented.

2009: with the Tri-Temp Option, the MEMS Test Cells are able to apply the thermal conditioning to perform the test at temperature.

2010: SPEA presents the new range of flying probe tester 4060-4020-4030 and PMTC Series test cells for power modules.

2011: MEMS Test Cells for magnetic and pressure sensors are made. Two new units for handling components – Bowl Feeder and Reel Sort Unit – are added to the test cell modules. SPEA is now the No. 1 company in the world in the testing of inertial MEMS (accelerometers, gyroscopes).

2012: The MEMS Test Cell for proximity sensors is born. SPEA staff grows by 10% compared to the previous year.

2013: SPEA creates the DOT (Oriented Device Tester), 768 analog / digital channels in a very small footprint. The 3030 Benchtop is born.

2014: The new range of multifunction Flying Probes S2 testers introduces new features such as LED test and 3D laser test of the electronic board.

2015: The new H3580 pick&place test handler provides a throughput of 33,000 units per hour, configurable input/output media (tray, bulk, wafer/strip on tape, output reel), MEMS stimulus for different devices (inertial sensors, humidity sensors, pressure sensors, UV sensors, proximity sensors, MEMS microphones, magnetic sensors, combo sensors, and other IC devices) and configurable pickup number, matrix and pitch.

2016: SPEA launches the 4080, 8-axes dual side flying probe tester. Innovative granite chassis, combined with linear motion technologies, are used to improve probing precision and test speed.

2017: SPEA designs the DOT800, an innovative multi-core analog mixed signal tester 

2019: SPEA develops the STU200, a new test unit for high g inertial sensors, whose main application is in testing the accelerometers used in automotive airbags. The company also launches the T100, a functional tester also known as "optomechatronics tester" for its capability to calibrate and test devices that combine microelectronics, micromechanics, microoptics, sensor and MEMS technologies.

2020: SPEA complements its electronics board testers with a line of automatic board handling units for the automatic loading/unloading of PCB and devices from rack. In the same year, a new line of board testers expressly designed for power electronics is marketed.

References

External links 
 SPEA Official Web Site

Equipment semiconductor companies
Electronic test equipment manufacturers
Italian brands